Bonnie Buckingham (March 25, 1923 – January 13, 2019), better known as Bonnie Guitar, was an American singer, musician, producer, and businesswoman. She was best known for her 1957 country-pop crossover hit "Dark Moon". She became one of the first female country music singers to have hit songs cross over from the country charts to the pop charts.

She co-founded the record company Dolton Records in the late 1950s, that launched the careers of The Fleetwoods and The Ventures. In 1960, she left Dolton and became part owner of Jerden Records.

Early life and rise to fame
Born in 1923 in Seattle, Washington, United States, to John and Doris Buckingham, Bonnie was initially raised in Redondo Beach along Puget Sound. Later, the family (including her five siblings) moved inland to a farm just outside the rural town of Auburn. She began performing at age 16, having taken up playing the guitar as a teenager, which led to her stage name, Bonnie Guitar. She later started songwriting.

In 1944 she married her former guitar teacher Paul Tutmarc; the couple had one daughter, Paula (born 1950), but split up in 1955, and Bonnie moved to Los Angeles. Through much of the 1950s, she worked as a session guitarist at quite a few small labels, like Abbot, Fabor, and  Radio Recorders.

Working at these places got Guitar noticed as a professional guitarist as she ended up playing on sessions for many well-known singers, like Jim Reeves, Dorsey Burnette, Ned Miller, and the DeCastro Sisters. After working with so many singers, she acquired her own singing aspirations herself and a desire to make her very own recording career in the process.

Following the release of her first single, "If You See My Love Dancing" on Fabor Records, Bonnie heard a demo of "Dark Moon" from Fabor's owner, Fabor Robinson, a tune written by Ned Miller, with whom she worked as a session guitarist. Robinson was dissatisfied with how Dorsey Burnette sang a version of it and offered it to Guitar. "I said, 'I'll give up my royalties and everything just to do this song,'" she told Robinson in recounting their collaboration on "Dark Moon" to Wayne Jancik in The Billboard Book of One-Hit Wonders. "I knew it was up for grabs and somebody was gonna get it. I got it, but he took me at my word, and I really did give up my royalties. It was one of the hardest things I ever put together. Ned [Miller] wrote it, but we tried in maybe five or six different ways in different studios before it came out right." The final version consisted of just two guitars and a bass backing Bonnie.

The song was originally issued under Fabor Records in 1956. "Dark Moon" was then issued over to Dot Records and by the spring of 1957, "Dark Moon" hit the pop top 10 list and went into the country top 15 list.

Early music success in 1957

When Bonnie's rendition of "Dark Moon" hit the country and pop charts in the Spring of 1957, she received recognition in the music business. Not only was she one of the few female country singers at the time, but she was also one of the few country singers that had a hit on the Country and Pop charts at the same time.

Only one other female country singer was achieving this type of crossover success Guitar was having at the time, which was Patsy Cline, when her single "Walkin' After Midnight" was a No. 2 Country hit and a No. 12 Pop hit at the same time. "Dark Moon" brought Guitar a wide audience, and she was soon appearing on quite a few Pop Music programs. Similar to Patsy Cline, Bonnie could not follow-up her crossover success either. Her follow-up to "Dark Moon" called "Mister Fire Eyes" failed to make a substantial impact on the Pop charts, making it only to No. 71 there. On the Country charts though, it was again a Top 15 hit. Because she could not follow-up her crossover success, her contract soon ended with Dot Records, and Guitar returned to Washington.

Running a record label and re-entering country music in the 1960s

Guitar however decided she would form her very own record label called Dolphin Records which she co-founded with refrigerator salesman Bob Reisdorff. When the pair decided to rename the label Dolton Records (they were forced to, due an already-existing Dolphin label name), many of Guitar's singles like "Candy Apple Red" and "Born to Be With You" were released. In 1959, her own recording career was superseded by that of a high school trio called The Fleetwoods. The trio was signed to the Dolton label and soon had major Pop Music hits in the Spring and Summer of 1959, with two No. 1 hits, "Come Softly to Me" and "Mr. Blue".

Soon another group called The Ventures were signed to Bonnie's Dolton label. They too had a monster hit called "Walk Don't Run". However, Guitar thought it was time she would get her own music career back on foot. She soon left Dolton, and went back to Dot Records where she recorded a series of country albums throughout the 1960s.

In 1961, she appeared as herself on an episode of To Tell The Truth with Johnny Carson, Ralph Bellamy, Dina Merrill, and Betty White as panelists. Only White correctly identified her.

In the summer and fall of 1963, she took a temporary leave to record a concept album under contract with Charter Records. The album told a romantic story beginning with songs featuring themes about first sight, through courting, going steady, threats from others, getting engaged, getting it broken off, having the man marry someone else and finally having the woman live happily ever after on her own at the end. Unfortunately, the original heyday of concept albums by the likes of Frank Sinatra and Nat King Cole had long since been over by 1964, and the new times for concept albums by the likes of the Beatles and Pink Floyd were a few years off yet, so the album was shelved. Even though the album was never released commercially, in its original format, a single was released entitled "Outside Looking In" — however, it failed to show on either the country or pop charts. White label charter test pressings of the original concept album exist, however, and most of the songs on it found their way onto subsequent albums, with the remaining material such as the country remake version of "Dark Moon" and Ned Miller's "Lucky Star" being featured in a 1972 Paramount Records double-album compilation of her work.

It was in 1966 that she began a brief stint as one of the most successful female soloists in the country music field. "I'm Living in Two Worlds" became Guitar's first Top 10 Country hit (the record also hit the pop Hot 100). She scored an even bigger country success in 1967 with the No. 4 hit "A Woman in Love". That same year, she won the Academy of Country Music's "Top Female Vocalist" award. In 1968, "I Believe in Love" was another Top 10 hit. Guitar teamed up with Buddy Killen, and together they had a minor hit duet with "A Truer Love You'll Never Find (Than Mine)" which was issued in 1969 at a time when Guitar's chart success was starting to fade.

Later career
In the 1970s, Guitar recorded for Columbia Records and MCA Records and had occasional minor hit records. She charted for the first time in many years in 1980 with the single "Honey On the Moon". In 1986, she recorded for the Tumbleweed label. She later continued performing and playing until she announced she was retiring in 1996. She lived in Soap Lake, Washington, and in 2014 started producing and writing music and still performed on weekends at the age of 92 with her band.

Personal life and death 
She raised cattle and quarter horses in Orting, Washington, with her second husband, Mario DePiano, whom she married in 1969. He died in 1983.

Bonnie Guitar died in Soap Lake, Washington on January 12, 2019, at the age of 95.

Discography

References

External links
Bonnie Guitar entry, HistoryLink.org
Bonnie Guitar Interview NAMM Oral History Library (2018)

 

1923 births
2019 deaths
American racehorse owners and breeders
American women pop singers
American women country singers
American country singer-songwriters
Businesspeople from Washington (state)
Dot Records artists
RCA Victor artists
Dolton Records artists
Columbia Records artists
MCA Records artists
Musicians from Seattle
People from Auburn, Washington
Singer-songwriters from Washington (state)
People from Soap Lake, Washington
People from Sumner, Washington
20th-century American businesspeople
20th-century American women
21st-century American women